Keep It Hot is a live album released by the funk/R&B group Cameo in 2007. In addition to the live material, two studio tracks were included: "Come Fly With Me" and "Nasty", both written by Larry Blackmon. The "Mega-Mix" is a remix of the album's live tracks. This album is the third album in 2007 to be a nearly track for track re-release of Nasty from 1996. However, Nasty's "Mega-Mix" was left off in favor of three new tracks.

Track listing
 "Intro" – 1:03
 "Flirt" – 1:36 (Blackmon, Jenkins)
 "She's Strange" – 2:37 (Blackmon, Jenkins, Leftenant, Singleton)
 "Back and Forth" – 5:54 (Blackmon, Jenkins, Kendrick, Leftenant)
 "Skin I'm In" – 5:09 (Blackmon)
 "Why Have I Lost You" – 6:10 (Blackmon)
 "Sparkle" – 4:23 (Blackmon, Lockett)
 "Candy" – 4:45 (Blackmon, Jenkins)
 "Shake Your Pants" (Intro) – 0:42
 "Shake Your Pants" – 4:00 (Blackmon)
 "I Just Want to Be" – 1:38 (Blackmon, Johnson)
 "Keep It Hot" – 5:12 (Blackmon, Lockett)
 "Word Up!" – 6:44 (Blackmon, Jenkins)
 "Come Fly With Me" – 3:57 (Blackmon)
 "Nasty" – 3:44 (Blackmon)
 "Let Me Put Love on Your Mind" – X:XX (Cameo)
 "Heartbeat" – X:XX (Cameo, Andrews, Ronnie)
 "No Hiding Place" – X:XX (Cameo, Wilson, Ronnie)

References 

2007 live albums
Cameo (band) albums